The word perfume  is used today to describe scented mixtures and is derived from the Latin word, "per fumus," meaning through smoke. The word Perfumery refers to the art of making perfumes. Perfume was refined by the Romans, the Persians and the Arabs. Although perfume and perfumery also existed in East Asia, much of its fragrances were incense based. The basic ingredients and methods of making perfumes are described by Pliny the Elder in his Naturalis Historia.

Mesopotamia 

The world's first recorded chemist is a woman named Tapputi, a perfume maker whose existence was recorded on a 1200 BCE Cuneiform tablet in Babylonian Mesopotamia. She held a powerful role in the Mesopotamian government and religion, as the overseer of the Mesopotamian Royal Palace. She developed methods for scent extraction techniques that would lay the basis for perfume making. She recorded her techniques and methods and those were passed on, with her most groundbreaking technique in using solvents.

India 

Perfume and perfumery also existed in Indus civilization, which existed from 3300 BCE to 1300 BCE. One of the earliest distillation of Ittar was mentioned in the Hindu Ayurvedic text Charaka Samhita and Sushruta Samhita. The perfume references are part of a larger text called Brihat-Samhita written by Varāhamihira, an Indian astronomer, mathematician, and astrologer living in the city of Ujjain. He was one of the ‘nine jewels’ in the court of Vikramaditya. The perfume portion mainly deals with the manufacture of perfumes to benefit ‘royal personages’. The text is written as Sanskrit slokas with commentary by a 10th-century Indian commentator Utpala.

According to a 1975 report, archeologist Dr Paolo Rovesti found a terracotta distillation apparatus in the Indus valley together with oil containers made of the same material, carbon dated to 3000 BCE. The report also states that terracotta vessels with plugged orifices of woven materials were used so that when fragrant plant materials were covered with boiling water the vapours impregnated the material, which was subsequently wrung out to isolate the oil.

Cyprus 

To date, the oldest perfumery was discovered on the island of Cyprus. Excavations in 2004-2005 under the initiative of an Italian archaeological team unearthed evidence of an enormous factory that existed 4,000 years ago during the Bronze Age.  This covered an estimated surface area of over 4,000m² indicating that perfume manufacturing was on an industrial scale.  The news of this discovery was reported extensively through the world press and many artifacts are already on display in Rome.
The Bible describes a sacred perfume (Exodus 30:22-33) consisting of liquid myrrh, fragrant cinnamon, fragrant cane, and cassia.  Its use was forbidden, except by the priests.
The women wore perfume to present their beauty.

Islamic 

Islamic cultures contributed significantly to the development of Middle Eastern perfumery in two significant areas: perfecting the extraction of fragrances through steam distillation and introducing new raw materials. Both have greatly influenced Western perfumery and scientific developments, particularly chemistry.

With a rise of Islam, Muslims improved perfume production and continued to use perfumes in daily life and in practicing religion. They used musk, roses and amber, among other materials. As traders, Islamic cultures such as the Arabs and Persians had wider access to a wide array of spices, resins, herbs, precious woods, herbs and animal fragrance materials such as ambergris and musk. In addition to trading, many of the flowers and herbs used in perfumery were cultivated by the Muslims — rose and jasmine were native to the region, and many other plants (i.e.: bitter orange and other citrus trees, all of which imported from China and southeast Asia) could be successfully cultivated in the Middle East, and are to this day key ingredients in perfumery.

In Islamic culture, perfume usage has been documented as far back as the 6th century and its usage is considered a religious duty. Muhammad said:

They often used to blend extracts with the cement of which mosques were built. Such rituals gave incentives to scholars to search and develop a cheaper way to produce incenses and in mass production.

The Arabic philosopher al-Kindi (c. 801–873) wrote a book on perfumes called ‘Book of the Chemistry of Perfume and Distillations’. It contained more than a hundred recipes for fragrant oils, salves, aromatic waters and substitutes or imitations of costly drugs. The book also described one hundred and seven methods and recipes for perfume-making, and even the perfume making equipment, like the alembic, still bears its Arabic name.

The Persian Muslim doctor and chemist Ibn Sina (also known as Avicenna) introduced the process of extracting oils from flowers by means of distillation, the procedure most commonly used today. He first experimented with the rose. Until his discovery, liquid perfumes were mixtures of oil and crushed herbs, or petals which made a strong blend. Rose water was more delicate, and immediately became popular. Both of the raw ingredients and distillation technology significantly influenced western perfumery and scientific developments, particularly chemistry.

Arabian perfume arrived to European courts through Al-Andalus in the west, and on the other side, with the crusaders in the east. For instance, eggs and floral perfumes were brought to Europe in the 11th and 12th centuries from Arabia, by returning crusaders, through trade with the Islamic world. Those who traded for these were most often also involved in trade for spices and dyestuffs. There are records of the Pepperers Guild of London, going back to 1179; which show them trading with Muslims in spices, perfume ingredients and dyes. Catharina de Medici initiated the perfume industry in Europe when she left Italy in the 16th century to marry the French crown prince.

Western 

Knowledge of perfumery came to Europe as early as the 14th century due partially to Arabic influences and knowledge. But it was the Hungarians who ultimately introduced the first modern perfume. The first modern perfume, made of scented oils blended in an alcohol solution, was made in 1370 at the command of Queen Elizabeth of Hungary and was known throughout Europe as Hungary Water. The art of perfumery prospered in Renaissance Italy, and in the 16th century, Italian refinements were taken to France by Catherine de' Medici's personal perfumer, Rene le Florentin. His laboratory was connected with her apartments by a secret passageway, so that no formulas could be stolen en route.

France
France quickly became the European center of perfume and cosmetic manufacture.  Cultivation of flowers for their perfume essence, which had begun in the 14th century, grew into a major industry in the south of France mainly in Grasse now considered the world capital of perfume. During the Renaissance period, perfumes were used primarily by royalty and the wealthy to mask body odors resulting from the sanitary practices of the day. Partly due to this patronage, the western perfumery industry was created.
Perfume enjoyed huge success during the 17th century. Perfumed gloves became popular in France and in 1656, the guild of glove and perfume-makers was established. Perfumers were also known to create poisons; for instance, a French duchess was murdered when a perfume/poison was rubbed into her gloves and was slowly absorbed into her skin.

Perfume came into its own when Louis XV came to the throne in the 18th century. His court was called "la cour parfumée" (the perfumed court). Madame de Pompadour ordered generous supplies of perfume, and King Louis demanded a different fragrance for his apartment every day. The court of Louis XIV was even named due to the scents which were applied daily not only to the skin but also to clothing, fans and furniture. Perfume substituted for soap and water. The use of perfume in France grew steadily. By the 18th century, aromatic plants were being grown in the Grasse region of France to provide the growing perfume industry with raw materials. Even today, France remains the centre of the European perfume design and trade.

After Napoleon came to power, exorbitant expenditures for perfume continued. Two quarts of violet cologne were delivered to him each week, and he is said to have used sixty bottles of double extract of jasmine every month. Josephine had stronger perfume preferences. She was partial to musk, and she used so much that sixty years after her death the scent still lingered in her boudoir.

England 

Perfume use peaked in England during the reigns of Henry VIII (reigned 1509–1547) and Queen Elizabeth I (reigned 1558–1603). 
All public places were scented during Queen Elizabeth's rule, since she could not tolerate bad smells. It was said that the sharpness of her nose was equaled only by the slyness of her tongue. 
Ladies of the day took great pride in creating delightful fragrances and they displayed their skill in mixing scents in a manor houses' still room.

As with industry and the arts, perfume underwent profound change in the 19th century. Changing tastes and the development of modern chemistry laid the foundations of modern perfumery as alchemy gave way to chemistry.

Russia 

Perfume manufacture in Russia grew after 1861 and became globally significant by the early 20th century. The production of perfume in the Soviet Union became a part of the planned economy in the 1930s, although output was not high.

Americas 

In early America, the first scents were colognes and scented water by French explorers in New France. Florida water, an uncomplicated mixture of eau de cologne with a dash of oil of cloves, cassia and lemongrass, was popular.

See also 

 Scented water

References

Further reading 
 Dyhouse, Carol. "Perfume History Dreams" History Today (Sept 2020) 70#9 pp 40–51, online.
 

Perfumery
History of cosmetics